Darren Roy Mack (born January 31, 1961) became the subject of an international manhunt in June 2006 after being charged with the stabbing death of his 39-year-old estranged wife, Charla Mack, in the garage of their Reno, Nevada home. Mack was also suspected of, and later charged with, the sniper shooting of Family Court Judge Chuck Weller, who was handling the couple’s acrimonious divorce. Charla Mack was murdered after 9:00 a.m. on June 12, 2006, and Judge Weller was shot around 11:05 a.m. the same day. Judge Weller spent time recovering, and returned to his courtroom on August 16.

According to a close friend, Mack was angry over a divorce settlement issued by Judge Weller. In addition to child support capped by state law at $849 per month, Darren Mack was ordered to pay $10,000 per month for spousal support plus household expenses. Darren Mack's gross monthly income was approximately $44,000 (528,000/yr), while his wife had no income.

Mack evaded police for 10 days, during which time he was featured on the Fox show America's Most Wanted and the FBI’s Most Wanted website.  Mack was a hunter and sportsman and records show he owned a .40-caliber Smith & Wesson handgun and a Bushmaster .223 semi-automatic rifle.  Police said he possessed a federal firearms license and permit to carry a concealed weapon.  A search of his apartment found ammunition and bomb materials.  Mack surrendered to Mexican authorities after they surrounded him at a resort's pool in Puerto Vallarta on June 22, 2006. The following day he was flown to Dallas, Texas for booking, and returned to Reno.  Authorities located Mack’s rented silver Ford Explorer in Ensenada.

On November 5, 2007, Mack pleaded guilty to first degree murder and entered an Alford plea on the charge of attempted murder.

Biography

Early life 

Darren Mack grew up in northern Nevada and graduated from Reno High School. He attended the University of Nevada on a baseball scholarship. Mack had been involved in the family-owned Palace Jewelry and Loan pawn shop since the age of seven, and at the time of his arrest was a part-owner and eBay merchant. In 2003 his income was estimated at $500,000 annually, and his net worth at $9.4 million. According to his brother Landon, Mack was active politically and founded the Nevada Pawnbroker Association

Marriages 

From 1986 to 1991, Mack had been married to Debra Ashlock; the couple had a son and daughter. According to The Union, this was Mack’s second marriage.  He and Charla were married on May 13, 1995, and she filed for divorce on February 7, 2005. The couple had a 7-year-old daughter. Charla warned a family friend, "He's out to get me and someday he will probably kill me."  Ironically, in 1998 a Reno billboard had proclaimed "The Mack Family Presents: Darren Mack. 1998 Father/Husband of the Year. A unanimous decision by his wife, Charla, and his three wonderful children."

Trial

Mack was originally defended by attorneys Scott Freeman of Reno and David Chesnoff of Las Vegas. Chesnoff has built a national reputation by representing celebrities including Martha Stewart and Britney Spears.  The Washoe County District Attorney recused his office from the case because of a longstanding personal relationship with Darren Mack, and because he could be a witness. Chief Deputy DA Robert Daskas and Assistant DA Christopher Lalli of the Clark County District Attorney’s office handled the prosecution.

At a preliminary hearing on August 30, 2006, Mack was held over for trial. His defense attorneys sought a court-ordered mental competency evaluation. On September 11, prosecutors announced they would not seek the death penalty. Mack pleaded not guilty to the charges at an arraignment on September 13, and his trial was set for October 1, 2007. As of October 4, 2006, attorney Scott Freeman tried to get Mack's attempted murder charge dropped.

Following his earlier decision in the criminal cases, on October 13 Senior Judge J. Charles Thompson disqualified the entire Washoe County bench from all civil cases against Mack. The trial was moved to Las Vegas, and Clark County District Judge Douglas Herndon was appointed to the case.

On November 5, 2007, Mack pleaded guilty to first-degree murder and entered an Alford plea to the attempted murder charge, just as the trial was to begin, in exchange for a recommendation by the prosecutor for life in prison with parole available after 20 years. The judge was not bound by the sentencing recommendation. Mack said during the plea, "I do understand right now in my state of mind that shooting at the judiciary is not a proper form of political redress".

Mack attempted to withdraw his pleas, saying he was coerced by Chesnoff and Freeman and that his signature was forged. Judge Douglas Herndon denied Mack's motion to withdraw, filed by his new defense attorney William Routsis. During sentencing, Routsis continued to renew his requests for Herndon to grant Mack a new trial.

Under the terms of the plea agreement, Herndon sentenced Mack to life in prison for murdering his wife. He also gave Mack the maximum sentence of 40 years, with parole eligibility after 16 years, for the attempted murder of Judge Weller and a deadly weapon enhancement. The sentences run consecutively, rendering Mack ineligible for parole for at least 36 years. Another hearing on his arguments was scheduled for April 2008.

On March 18, 2008, a Washoe County jury delivered a $590 million settlement against Mack in the wrongful-death lawsuit of his wife, Charla. $560 million was awarded to the couple's young daughter, Erika, with the remainder to go to his wife's estate.

Appeals
Mack continues to appeal his conviction (on grounds that he pleaded guilty under duress) and is also appealing the $590 million civil judgment. Judge Weller has filed a personal injury lawsuit against Mack, seeking compensatory and punitive damages.

Mack's appeal, which was based on the argument that the judge should have allowed him to withdraw his guilty plea, was heard by the Nevada Supreme Court in 2010, and denied.

In February 2012 Mack again raised this issue in a petition filed in United States District Court.

Mack claims he has no money left.

See also 

 America's Most Wanted

References

External links 
 News articles related to Darren Mack case, by Reno Gazette-Journal
 Mack's profile on America’s Most Wanted
 Nevada Offender Tracking Information System (NOTIS) - Offender Detail Record
 William J Routsis
 American Monster "Right Before Your Eyes" | Investigation Discovery television documentary episode, aired: July 2016.

1961 births
American people convicted of murder
Living people
Businesspeople from Reno, Nevada
American prisoners sentenced to life imprisonment
Prisoners sentenced to life imprisonment by Nevada
Reno High School alumni
People convicted of murder by Nevada
People who entered an Alford plea
American criminal snipers
2006 murders in the United States
20th-century American businesspeople